The Fourth Legislative Assembly of the Wisconsin Territory convened from , to , from , to , from , to , and from , to , in regular session.

The first session of this Legislative Assembly was effected by a dispute with the Governor over whether or not the session was legally sanctioned by Congress.  The session was adjourned twice, and finally came back into session on the governor's request in March 1843, when they finished their business.  This Legislative Assembly was also unusually long, spanning four general elections (1843, 1844, 1845, & 1846).

Major events
 May 22, 1843: The first major wagon train departed from Missouri with 1,000 settlers on the Oregon Trail to the northwest.
 May 24, 1844: The first electrical telegram was sent by Samuel Morse from the U.S. Capitol in Washington, D.C., to the B&O Railroad "outer depot" in Baltimore, saying "What hath God wrought". 
 June 21, 1844: Nathaniel P. Tallmadge appointed 3rd Governor of the Wisconsin Territory.
 September 23, 1844: Morgan Lewis Martin elected delegate to the United States House of Representatives from Wisconsin Territory's at-large congressional district.
 November 1December 4, 1844: James K. Polk elected President of the United States.
 January 23, 1845: The United States Congress established a uniform date for the holding of federal elections—the first Tuesday after the first Monday in November, on even-numbered years.
 March 1, 1845: President John Tyler signed a bill approving the annexation of Texas.
 March 4, 1845: Inauguration of James K. Polk as the 11th President of the United States.
 April 8, 1845: Henry Dodge appointed 4th Governor of the Wisconsin Territory.
 December 2, 1845: President James K. Polk announced to Congress that the Monroe Doctrine should be strictly enforced, and that the United States should aggressively expand into the West.
 December 29, 1845: Texas was admitted to the United States as the 28th U.S. state.
 April 25, 1846: The Thornton Affair occurred on disputed land between Texas and Mexico, initiating the Mexican–American War.
 May 13, 1846: The United States officially declared war on Mexico.
 June 10, 1846: The California Republic declared independence from Mexico.
 August 3, 1846: Abraham Lincoln was elected to the United States House of Representatives from Illinois's 7th congressional district.
 October 5December 16, 1846: The first Wisconsin constitutional convention was held in Madison, Wisconsin Territory.

Major legislation
 March 23, 1843: An Act fixing the time of holding the annual sessions of the Legislative Assembly, and for other purposes.
 April 10, 1843: An Act to repeal an act incorporating the State Bank of Wisconsin.
 April 17, 1843: An Act to abolish certain offices therein named.  Abolished the offices of "district attorney" which were previously multi-county officials.  County governments were instead empowered by this act to each appoint a prosecuting attorney.
 April 17, 1843: An Act to provide for completing a new roof upon the capitol, and for other purposes.
 April 17, 1843: An Act concerning removals from office.  Required the Governor to make written notification when removing a person from office.  The act was originally vetoed by the Governor, but the veto was overridden by the Assembly. 
 January 24, 1844: An Act prescribing the time of holding the annual session of the Legislative Assembly.  Set the start of the legislative session as the first Monday of January. 
 January 26, 1844: An Act to submit to the people of Wisconsin the question of the expediency of forming a state government.
 January 30, 1845: Resolution to declare the name of the Territory, "Wisconsin."
 January 31, 1846: An Act in relation to the formation of a State Government in Wisconsin.

Sessions
 1st session: December 5, 1842April 17, 1843
 2nd session: December 4, 1843January 31, 1844
 3rd session: January 6, 1845February 24, 1845
 4th session: January 5, 1846February 3, 1846

Leadership

Council President
 Moses M. Strong (D) – during the 1st & 3rd sessions
 Marshall Strong (D) – during the 2nd session
 Nelson Dewey (D) – during the 4th session

Speaker of the House of Representatives
 Albert G. Ellis (D) – during 1st session
 George H. Walker (D) – during 2nd & 3rd sessions
 Mason C. Darling (D) – during 4th session

Members

Members of the Council

Members of the House of Representatives
Members of the House of Representatives for the Fourth Wisconsin Territorial Assembly:

Employees

Council employees
 Secretary:
 John V. Ingersol, 1st session, resigned March 31, 1843
 John P. Sheldon, 1st session, following Ingersol's resignation
 Ben C. Eastman, 2nd, 3rd & 4th sessions, resigned Jan. 19, 1846
 William Rudolph Smith, 4th session, following Eastman's resignation
 Sergeant-at-Arms:
 Charles C. Brown, 1st session
 G. C. S. Vail, 2nd session
 Charles H. Larkin, 3rd session
 Joseph Brisbois, 4th session

House employees
 Chief Clerk:
 John Catlin, 1st & 2nd sessions
 La Fayette Kellogg, 3rd & 4th sessions
 Sergeant-at-Arms:
 William S. Anderson, 1st session
 J. W. Trowbridge, 2nd session
 Chauncey Davis, 3rd session
 David Bonham, 4th session

Notes

References

External links
 Wisconsin Legislature website

1842 in Wisconsin Territory
1843 in Wisconsin Territory
1844 in Wisconsin Territory
1845 in Wisconsin Territory
1846 in Wisconsin Territory
1840s in Wisconsin
Wisconsin
Wisconsin
Wisconsin
Wisconsin
Wisconsin
Wisconsin legislative sessions